Monodontides kolari is a butterfly of the family Lycaenidae. It is found on Sulawesi.

References

 , 1983. Blue Butterflies of the Lycaenopsis Group: 1-309, 6 pls. London
, 1926. Neue Lycaenenformen hauptsächlich von Celebes. Ent. Mitt. 15: 78-91.

Monodontides
Butterflies described in 1926